Elafonisos is a small Greek island between the Peloponnese and Kythira. It lies off the coast of Cape Malea and Vatika.

Overview

The population is between 300 and 350 during the winter but increases dramatically in the summer months. During July and August the number of tourist visitors reach over 3,000 per day (bringing with them some 1,600 cars). Many people visit the island for its light coloured, sandy beaches. Among the most well known of its beaches are Sarakiniko, Fragos (Simos) and Panagias Nissia, all filled with blue-green waters.

Elafonisos is by far the largest inhabited island in the Peloponnese archipelago, and the only one that is a separate municipality. There are also some archaeological discoveries to explore on the island and in the surrounding waters. The main church of the community is Agios Spyridon (Greek: Άγιος Σπυρίδων), which is built on a tiny separate piece of land which is connected by a bridge over shallow waters to the rest of the island. The community's land area also includes  of the mainland consisting mainly of the famous Punta Beach.

Historical population

History
In antiquity, Elafonisos did not constitute an island but a peninsula with the name "Onou Gnathos" (Greek: Όνου Γνάθος) (Donkey's Jawbone) according to Pausanias.  Just off the coast of Elafonissos lies the archeological site of Pavlopetri, a sunken city dating back to the early 3rd millennium BC and thought to have been claimed by the sea around 1000 BC.

References

External links

Elafonisos Municipality (Greek)
Elafonisos(English)
Elafonissos (English) 
Elafonisos - Lakonia

Islands of Greece
Municipalities of Peloponnese (region)
Populated places in Laconia
Islands of Peloponnese (region)
Landforms of Laconia